R85 (or RMC 85, after the Radcliffe Observatory Magellanic Clouds catalog) is a candidate luminous blue variable located in the LH-41 OB association in the Large Magellanic Cloud.

R85 has been shown to vary erratically in brightness with an amplitude of about 0.3 magnitudes. It shows variations on several timescales, sometimes with a distinct 400 day period. It has also shown temperature changes associated with brightness changes over several years, a characteristic of luminous blue variables.

It is theorized to be making a bubble known as DEM L132a with its stellar wind in the nebula LHA-120 N119, along with S Doradus. It has an infrared excess consistent with a stellar wind contribution.

References 

Stars in the Large Magellanic Cloud
Large Magellanic Cloud
Luminous blue variables
Dorado (constellation)
J05175607-6916037
CPD-69 352
269321
Extragalactic stars